Oman Olympic Committee (IOC code: OMA) is the National Olympic Committee representing Oman.

External links 
Oman Olympic Committee

Oman
Oly
Oman at the Olympics
1982 establishments in Oman
Sports organizations established in 1982